Security analysis is the analysis of tradeable financial instruments called securities. It deals with finding the proper value of individual securities (i.e., stocks and bonds). These are usually classified into debt securities, equities, or some hybrid of the two. Tradeable credit derivatives are also securities. Commodities or futures contracts are not securities. They are distinguished from securities by the fact that their performance is not dependent on the management or activities of an outside or third party.  Options on these contracts are however considered securities, since performance is now dependent on the activities of a third party. The definition of what is and what is not a security comes directly from the language of a United States Supreme Court decision in the case of SEC v. W. J. Howey Co. Security analysis for the purpose to state the effective value of an enterprise is typically based on the examination of fundamental business factors such as financial statements, going concern, business strategy and forecasts.

See also
Financial analyst
Stock valuation
Securities research

References

Financial markets